Vítkovice Mining and Iron Corporation was an iron mill in Ostrava, Vítkovice, Czechoslovakia founded by Salomon Meyer von Rothschild's heirs in 1873, it was the largest iron and steel works in Austria-Hungary.

History

Originally purchased by the Viennese banker Salomon Mayer von Rothschild in 1843, he also financed the extension of the Emperor Ferdinand Northern Railway from Vienna to Ostrava with a branch-off to his steel mill, which was completed in 1855.

In 1937, the company shares were transferred to a company named the Alliance Assurance Co., Ltd a forerunner of the RSA Insurance Group, and in which the London House of Rothschild still had a controlling interest.

During the Anschluss, Louis Nathaniel de Rothschild was arrested by the Gestapo during an attempted escape and was kept as a hostage for two years, until the London-based holding agreed to sell its Vitkovice shares to the German government for the discounted price of 2.9 million pounds. In May 1939 Baron Rothschild was released and the Vitkovice Works eventually became part of the Reichswerke Hermann Göring.

After World War II they were nationalised as the Vítkovické železárny Klement Gottwald n.p. (VŽKG) by the Czechoslovak state.

References

Companies of Czechoslovakia